Antonie Frederik Zürcher (2 January 1825 – 15 April 1876) was a Dutch painter, draughtsman, etcher and art teacher.

Zürcher was born in Nieuwer-Amstel as the oldest son of Johannes Cornelis Zurcher in a family of artists. After his formal training in Amsterdam he became a drawing teacher at the academy there. He married in Amsterdam in 1850 and the couple had 14 children, including the painter Johannes Wilhelm Cornelis Zurcher. After his school was closed he was reassigned a position in Maastricht, where he later died. His younger brother Frederik Willem Zürcher was also a painter.

References

External links

 Antonie Frederik Zurcher on artnet

1825 births
1876 deaths
Painters from Amsterdam
Dutch male painters
19th-century Dutch painters
19th-century male artists
19th-century Dutch male artists